The 136th Massachusetts General Court, consisting of the Massachusetts Senate and the Massachusetts House of Representatives, met in 1915 during the governorship of David I. Walsh. Calvin Coolidge served as president of the Senate and Channing H. Cox served as speaker of the House.

Senators

Representatives

See also
 1915 Massachusetts gubernatorial election
 64th United States Congress
 List of Massachusetts General Courts

References

Further reading

External links

 
 

Political history of Massachusetts
Massachusetts legislative sessions
massachusetts
1915 in Massachusetts